Abdul Hakim Sarkar is a Bangladeshi writer, academician and professor. He was 11th vice chancellor (27 December 2012 - 30 June 2016) of Islamic University, Bangladesh. He was a long time professor of Dhaka University at Social welfare and research institute.

Early life and education 
He was student of Dhaka University, finished his graduation and he was appointed  as a lecturer in Dhaka University.

Appoint IU VC 
Abdul Hakim Sarkar was appointed as 11th vice chancellor in  Islamic University. The appointment was made in a bid to remove the stalemate that began at the university three and a half months ago. He was removed at 30 June 2016 by chancellor of this university president Abdul Hamid in without citing any reason. But Sources at the Islamic University Teacher Association (IUTA) said the VC was involved in various irregularities and corruption during his tenure. Abdul Hakim Sarkar went on Hajj in 2014 at the invitation of the King of Saudi Arabia.

Book 

 Samāja kalyāṇa praśāsana (Bengali: সমাজ কল্যাণ প্রশাসন)

References 

Living people
Bangladeshi male writers
Bangladeshi educators
Vice-Chancellors of the Islamic University, Bangladesh
Year of birth missing (living people)
University of Dhaka alumni
Academic staff of the University of Dhaka